Pribylina is a village in Liptovský Mikuláš District in the Žilina Region of northern Slovakia, at the foot of Kriváň, Slovakia's symbolic and often considered most beautiful mountain.

History
In historical records the village was first mentioned in 1286.

Geography
The municipality lies at an altitude of 765 metres and covers an area of 86.124 km2. It has a population of about 1,362 people. There is an open-air museum of Liptov near the village, opened in 1991. There is an Autocamp near the entrance of the Račková valley. The river Belá flowing around the village is suitable for rafting.

References

External links
 Municipal website 
 Museum of Liptov Village at Slovakia.travel

Villages and municipalities in Liptovský Mikuláš District